Lars Paul-Erich "Lasse" Hattinen (16 May 1923 – 3 January 1961) was at the time the youngest Finnish World War II flying ace and a commercial airliner pilot. He achieved 6 air victories with the Morane-Saulnier M.S.406 between 25 June and 30 July 1944. Hattinen is recognized as the only pilot who flew the Mörkö Morane (also called "Bogey" and "Ogre Morane"), the plane's version developed in Finland. His three victories flying this plane were the only kills scored by the fighter. He had four regular victories flying Morane planes when he achieved his first Yak-1 victory in 1944. On his last flight, his plane caught fire, and he only barely survived with burns.  

After the war, he worked as an airliner pilot for the Finnish flag carrier Aero O/Y. He was the pilot of the ill-fated Aero Flight 311 which crashed in Kvevlax in January 1961. The investigation revealed that Hattinen and his co-pilot, neither of whom survived the crash, had been drinking heavily the night before the flight.

Legacy
The author Seppo Porvali wrote a biography about Hattinen titled Last Ace.

References

1923 births
1961 deaths
Aviators killed in aviation accidents or incidents
Finnish Air Force personnel
Finnish World War II flying aces
People from Jämsä
Victims of aviation accidents or incidents in Finland
Victims of aviation accidents or incidents in 1961